Krumpholz or Krumpholtz is a German surname that may refer to
Anne-Marie Krumpholtz (1755/1766-1813/1824), French harpist and composer
Annerose Fiedler (née Krumpholz in 1951), East German hurdler
Fanny Krumpholtz Pittar (1785–1815), Bohemian harpist and composer 
Jean-Baptiste Krumpholz (1742–1790), Czech composer, father of Fanny and brother of Wenzel
J. W. Krumpholz (born 1987), American water polo player
Kurt Krumpholz, American swimmer
Wenzel Krumpholz (1750–1817), Czech-born musician, brother of Jean-Baptiste

German-language surnames